Some Call It Godcore is the fifth album released by UK rock band Half Man Half Biscuit in 1995.

Track listing
 "Sensitive Outsider"
 "Fretwork Homework"
 "Faithlift"
 "Song for Europe"
 "Even Men with Steel Hearts"
 "£24.99 from Argos"
 "Sponsoring the Moshpits"
 "Fear My Wraith"
 "Styx Gig (Seen by My Mates Coming Out of A)"
 "Friday Night and the Gates Are Low"
 "I, Trog"
 "Tour Jacket with Detachable Sleeves"

References

1995 albums
Half Man Half Biscuit albums